Little Diomede Island or “Yesterday Isle” (formerly known as Krusenstern Island,  Ostrov Kruzenshterna) is an island of Alaska, United States. It is the smaller of the two Diomede Islands located in the middle of the Bering Strait between the Alaska mainland and Siberia.

Unlike its larger Russian neighbor, Little Diomede retains a permanent native population. As of 2021, Little Diomede had a population of 82, down from its recorded peak of 178 in 1990. The entirety of the island is in the City of Diomede (named  as well). The island is not part of any organized borough, so some services are provided directly by the state. For census purposes, it is included in the Nome Census Area.

During the Cold War, the section of the border between the U.S. and the USSR separating Big and Little Diomede became known as the "Ice Curtain". In August 1987, however, Lynne Cox swam from Little Diomede to Big Diomede (approx. ) and was congratulated jointly by Mikhail Gorbachev and Ronald Reagan.

Etymology
The Diomede Islands are named after Saint Diomedes. Danish-Russian navigator Vitus Bering (after whom the Bering Strait is named) sighted the Diomede Islands on August 16 (O.S., August 27 N.S.), 1728, the day on which the Russian Orthodox Church celebrates the memory of the saint.

Its Inupiaq name  means "the other one" or "the one over there".

Geography

On the western shore of the island is the village of Diomede, also known as Iŋaliq.

There is a heliport, the Diomede Heliport, with regular helicopter flights. During the winter, the villagers carve a runway into the thick ice sheet so that bush planes can deliver vital products, such as medicine. Due to annual variations of the ice sheet, the runway changes position every year.

Climate
Summer temperatures average . Winter temperatures average from  Annual precipitation averages , and annual snowfall averages . During summer months,
cloudy skies and fog prevail. The Bering Strait is generally frozen between mid-December and mid-June.

Geology
The Little Diomede island is composed of Cretaceous age granite or quartz monzonite. The location of the city is the only area which does not have near-vertical cliffs to the water. The island has very scant vegetation.

In popular culture
Little Diomede was featured in the first episode of Full Circle with Michael Palin, a 1997 BBC documentary series in which the broadcaster Michael Palin traversed many of the countries of the Pacific Rim. The Diomede Islands are also featured in the novel Further Tales of the City, by Armistead Maupin, and the miniseries based on the book. In addition, Alexander Armstrong visited the island as part of his 2015 series Land of the Midnight Sun.

See also 

 Diomede, Alaska
 List of islands of Alaska
 List of islands of the United States
 USSR–USA Maritime Boundary Agreement

Explanatory notes

References

External links

 Diomede Community Page
 Census 2000 information
 Diomede School
 You CAN see Russia from here! – Anderson Cooper 360

Bering Strait
Diomede Islands
Islands of Alaska
Islands of Nome Census Area, Alaska
Islands of the Bering Sea
Islands of the Chukchi Sea
Islands of Unorganized Borough, Alaska